"Far Away Eyes" is the sixth track from the English rock band the Rolling Stones' 1978 album, Some Girls. It was released, as the B-side of the single "Miss You", on Rolling Stones Records, on 9 June 1978. Rolling Stone magazine made it the 73rd song on their list of 100 Greatest Rolling Stone's Songs.

Origin
Mick Jagger and Keith Richards collaborated extensively on writing and composing the song, which was recorded in late 1977. A bootleg version with Richards singing exists. The Stones, longtime country music fans, incorporated many aspects of Bakersfield-style country music into this song. These included in particular Ronnie Wood's use of a pedal steel guitar for a solo and highlights, an instrument used on other songs from the album such as "Shattered" and "When the Whip Comes Down." Also of note is the plodding rhythm of Charlie Watts and Bill Wyman. Richards performed acoustic and electric guitars as well as sharing piano duties with Jagger.

Content
In the lyrics, the loneliness of life and the possibilities in finding love are dealt with:

The verses of the song are half sung, half spoken, with Jagger using a parodic Southern accent:

In a 1978 interview with Rolling Stone magazine, Jagger said: "You know, when you drive through Bakersfield on a Sunday morning or Sunday evening—I did that about six months ago—all the country music radio stations start broadcasting black gospel services live from L.A. And that's what the song refers to. But the song's really about driving alone, listening to the radio." On influences, Jagger stated: "I wouldn't say this song was influenced specifically by Gram (Parsons). That idea of country music played slightly tongue-in-cheek—Gram had that in 'Drugstore Truck Drivin' Man', and we have that sardonic quality, too." Asked by the interviewer if the girl in the song was a real one, Jagger replied, "Yeah, she's real, she's a real girl."

Live performances
The Rolling Stones have performed "Far Away Eyes" at every concert of their U.S. Tour 1978. It is performed in the concert film Some Girls: Live in Texas '78, featuring fiddle player Doug Kershaw.  Ever since they only played it only sporadically. A live recording from July 1995 was included on the album Totally Stripped (2016), and a performance from the Stones' 2006 A Bigger Bang Tour appears in the 2008 concert film Shine a Light and on the accompanying live album.  On 20 May 2013 the song was performed in Los Angeles as part of the Stones' "50 & Counting Tour."  During their Zip Code Tour the Stones performed "Far Away Eyes" at LP Field in Nashville, Tennessee on 17 June 2015. The Rolling Stones performed the song for the first time live since 2015—as the "vote song" chosen by the audience—at Raymond James Stadium in Tampa, Florida as part of their No Filter Tour. 

The song has been covered by The Handsome Family on their 2002 album Smothered and Covered.

Promotional video
The official promotional video was directed by Michael Lindsay-Hogg, who directed several other videos for the band, including those for "Start Me Up," "Jumpin' Jack Flash," and "Fool to Cry." Lindsay-Hogg also directed promotional videos for The Beatles and The Who.

Personnel
Mick Jagger – lead and backing vocals, piano
Keith Richards – acoustic and electric guitar, piano, backing vocals
Ronnie Wood – pedal steel guitar, backing vocals
Bill Wyman – bass guitar
Charlie Watts – drums

References

The Rolling Stones songs
1978 songs
Songs written by Jagger–Richards
Song recordings produced by Jagger–Richards
Music videos directed by Michael Lindsay-Hogg
Country rock songs
Blues rock songs
Virgin Records singles